Seyyed Ahmad Shah (also Romanized as Seyyed Āḥmad Shāh; also known as Cheshmeh Kabūd) is a village in Kuhdasht-e Shomali Rural District, in the Central District of Kuhdasht County, Lorestan Province, Iran. At the 2006 census, its population was 124, in 22 families.

References 

Towns and villages in Kuhdasht County